Kalkum is an urban quarter of Düsseldorf, part of Borough 5. It is in the north of the city, neighboring to Kaiserswerth, Angermund, Wittlaer and Ratingen.

Kalkum has been existing latest since the 12th century CE.
The old church of Kalkum and the old mill are from that century.

The Castle Kalkum was in earlier times the seat of the Hatzfelds. Before that castle was built, there was another castle from the middle age.
Currently there is the state archive of North Rhine-Westphalia in the castle.

There is a lot of green in Kalkum. On the other way, Kalkum is near to the  Düsseldorf Airport.

References

Klakum